Farmer's Requiem is a Canadian short documentary film, directed by Ramses Madina and released in 2007. Shot primarily in the rural Carp and Woodlawn areas of Ottawa, the film documents the decline of farming as a way of life through a portrait of the area's declining and dilapidated old farms.

The film premiered at the 2007 Toronto International Film Festival. It was subsequently screened at the Ottawa City Hall art gallery as the centrepiece of a two-month exhibition on the history of farming in the Ottawa area, alongside Madina's still photography of farm imagery.

The film was named to the Toronto International Film Festival's year-end Canada's Top Ten list for short films in 2007.

References

External links

2007 films
2007 short documentary films
Canadian short documentary films
Films shot in Ottawa
2000s English-language films
2000s Canadian films